Yeliz Kurt (born January 15, 1984) is a Turkish female middle distance runner competing mostly in the 800 m and 1500 m as well as 4 × 400 m relay events. Kurt tested positive for the anabolic steroid Stanozolol in June 2013 and was handed a two-year ban from sports.

Kurt was born in Trabzon, Turkey.

She won two silver medals, one in 800 m and the other in 1500 m, at the 2009 European Team Championships-First League held in Bergen, Norway. In 2011, she became gold medalist of the 800 m event at the European Team Championships-First League in Izmir, Turkey.

Kurt is the national record holder of 1000 m event with 2:39.92 set in 2009, and shares the record in indoor 4 × 400 m relay event with 3:37.37 set at the 2009 European Athletics Indoor Championships held in Turin, Italy. With her time of 2:02.47, she improved her own national record in indoor 800 m at the ELAN Meeting Bratislava on January 30, 2011. However, that record was broken on March 9, 2012 by Merve Aydın.

Doping 
Kurt tested positive for the anabolic steroid Stanozolol in June 2013 and was subsequently handed a two-year ban from sports. The ban expired on 25 June 2015.

Achievements

4x400 m relay

800 m

1500 m

References

External links

Sportspeople from Trabzon
1984 births
Doping cases in athletics
Living people
Turkish female middle-distance runners
Turkish sportspeople in doping cases
Enkaspor athletes
Athletes (track and field) at the 2009 Mediterranean Games
Mediterranean Games competitors for Turkey